International Anthems for the Human Race is the second album of Christian rock band All Star United. The album was released in 1998.

Track listing
 "Welcome to Our Big Rock Show"
 "Popular Americans"
 "International Anthems"
 "Thank You, Goodnight"
 "If We were Lovers"
 "Worldwide Socialites Unite"
 "I Need You Now"
 "Theme from Summer"
 "Everything Will Be Alright"
 "Superstar"
 "Put Your Arms Around Me"

References

1998 albums
All Star United albums